East Liverpool is a city in southeastern Columbiana County, Ohio, United States. The population was 9,958 at the 2020 census. It lies along the Ohio River within the Upper Ohio Valley and borders Pennsylvania to the east and West Virginia to the south.

East Liverpool is notable for its pottery industry, which was at one time the largest in the United States. Holly Black's ceramic-themed novel Doll Bones is set in East Liverpool.

History 

Native American petroglyphs exist in the area surrounding East Liverpool, including on Babbs Island and near the Little Beaver Creek. Before the arrival of European Americans, Mingo, Lenape, and Wyandot peoples lived in the area until the Battle of Fallen Timbers led to the Ohio Country's settlement. The Public Land Survey System of the United States was established by Congressional legislation in 1785, in order to provide an orderly mechanism for opening the Northwest Territory for settlement. The ordinance directed the Geographer of the United States, Thomas Hutchins, to survey an initial east–west base line. Hutchins began in 1786, using as his starting point a stake on north bank of the Ohio River placed by a 1785 survey team from Virginia and Pennsylvania to fix their common north–south boundary. Hutchins' work, completed in 1787, established the Seven Ranges, with a baseline about  line. This survey is believed to be "the first mathematically designed system and nationally conducted cadastral survey in any modern country."

East Liverpool traces its founding to 1798, when Irish immigrant Thomas Fawcett purchased 1,100 acres of land along the Ohio River in what was then Jefferson County. In 1802, he platted the town of St. Clair, named for Governor Arthur St. Clair of the Northwest Territory. It was called Fawcettstown for a time, before being renamed Liverpool in 1816, after Liverpool, England. Over its first few decades, a grist mill, multiple stores, and wharves opened in the town. The first schoolhouse opened in 1820, and the first religious center opened in 1834 when the Episcopalians erected a building on a 4th Street site provided by town developers. Liverpool was incorporated as East Liverpool in 1834 when Liverpool Township in Medina County objected to possible confusion.

Although Pittsburgh-based entrepreneurs invested in the town, it was smaller during this period than nearby Wellsville and New Lisbon. The arrival of English potter James Bennett in 1839 brought the establishment of the first bottle kiln site in East Liverpool, launching the town's largest industry and bringing in multiple waves of Western European immigration throughout the late 19th century. Another large employer outside of that industry was the Crucible Steel Company in nearby Midland, Pennsylvania. By 1880, East Liverpool had grown to be the largest city in the county. In 1905, the first city hospital opened. As of 1914, East Liverpool was served by the Cleveland and Pittsburgh Railroad. On October 22, 1934, local police and FBI agents led by Melvin Purvis shot and killed notorious bank robber Pretty Boy Floyd in a cornfield going toward Clarkson, Ohio, after Floyd fled East Liverpool, and his body was returned to the town for embalming.

In the 1960s, much of the downtown area was cleared to make way for the 4-lane expansion of Ohio State Route 11. The city reached its peak population of more than 26,000 in 1970, but its pottery industry had already begun to decline by the mid-1960s. As with other industries, production moved to developing countries where labor costs were cheaper. This cost many jobs and, ultimately, population in the Upper Ohio Valley area, as people moved away in search of work. Furthermore, many of the city's downtown businesses withdrew to strip malls in nearby Calcutta or left the area outright.

In 1963, a toxic waste incinerator was erected at an S. H. Bell Company warehouse in East Liverpool. Local investors believed the incinerator could be an alternative to the declining ceramics industry. In 2008, concerns were raised about toxic particles affecting East Liverpool residents' health, particularly manganese, which was found in high concentrations. East Liverpool residents were found to have higher than normal levels of manganese, cadmium, and lead in their blood, and the community was considered to be in a health crisis due to the presence of these toxic elements. Government agencies worked with S. H. Bell to decrease the toxic metals being released into the surrounding air and land, and from 2006 to 2013 air quality improved. In 2014, hazardous and toxic particles in air quality assessments increased. Activism to reduce the toxic waste began.  In 2005, the EPA declared the area surrounding the incinerator a "potential environmental justice area".

In the mid-1990s, the city renovated its downtown district. To improve its urban design, it installed Depression-era lightposts, developed a new center called Devon's Diamond, and reconstructed the old high school's clock tower. In 2010, East Liverpool lost its position as the most populous city in the county to Salem after 130 years and was later withdrawn from being a principal city in the micropolitan area.

Pottery industry 

The potteries of East Liverpool became the national center of ceramic toilet and table wares, with 85 firms operating at one time or another making two-thirds of the national output from 1880 to 1950. East Liverpool's pottery district encompasses East Liverpool and the surrounding towns of Wellsville, Ohio, and Chester and Newell, West Virginia, directly across the Ohio River. In 1887, East Liverpool had 21 general ware potteries that employed 2,558 operatives. By 1923 the 17 firms had 7,000 employees and operated 270 kilns, with $25,000,000 in annual output.

Englishman James Bennett established the industry in 1839, making use of good transportation and rich local clays. It quickly became the community's leading industry. East Liverpool became known as "The Crockery City." Potters from Staffordshire, England, began pouring into East Liverpool, attracted by higher wages and the prospect of land ownership. By 1879, there were 24 potteries in East Liverpool, nearly all operated by English immigrants. As late as 1900, East Liverpool remained "essentially a transplanted potting town of Englishmen". Until the turn of the century about 85% percent of the population could trace its heritage to England. After the English, the second largest ethnic group in East Liverpool were German settlers. From 1870 to 1890, the city more than doubled in population each decade as it attracted new industrial workers with the growth of the pottery industry. By 1910, its population exceeded 20,000. At various times, some of the largest potteries included the East Liverpool Pottery, Knowles, Taylor & Knowles; Taylor, Smith & Taylor; The Hall China Company, and Homer Laughlin China Company.

Of these potteries, two continue to operate in the area: the American Mug & Stein Company and the Fiesta Tableware Company, formerly Homer Laughlin. In the mid-19th century, East Liverpool also produced most of the yellowware pottery used in the United States. Among the most famous of East Liverpool's ceramics was the porcelain known as Lotus Ware. Produced by Knowles, Taylor & Knowles in the 1890s, this Moorish- and Persian-influenced artware swept the competition at the 1893 World's Fair in Chicago. The Museum of Ceramics in downtown East Liverpool has the world's largest public display of Lotus Ware.

Geography 

Neighborhoods include:

 Beechwood
 Downtown
 East End
 Fisher Park
 Klondyke
 Pleasant Heights
 Thompson
 West End
 Sunnyside
 Jethro

Demographics

2010 census
As of the census of 2010, there were 11,195 people, 4,601 households, and 2,892 families residing in the city. The racial makeup of the city was 91.7% White, 4.6% African American, 0.2% Native American, 0.2% Asian, 0.3% from other races, and 3.0% from two or more races. Hispanic or Latino of any race were 1.1% of the population.

There were 4,601 households, of which 33.4% had children under the age of 18 living with them, 36.0% were married couples living together, 20.1% had a female householder with no husband present, 6.7% had a male householder with no wife present, and 37.1% were non-families. 31.9% of all households were made up of individuals, and 11.9% had someone living alone who was 65 years of age or older. The average household size was 2.39 and the average family size was 2.97.

The median age in the city was 37.6 years. 25.4% of residents were under the age of 18; 9.5% were between the ages of 18 and 24; 24% were from 25 to 44; 26.5% were from 45 to 64; and 14.6% were 65 years of age or older. The gender makeup of the city was 47.6% male and 52.4% female.

2000 census
As of the census of 2000, there were 13,089 people, 5,261 households, and 3,424 families residing in the city. The population density was 3,010.3 people per square mile (1,161.8/km2). There were 5,743 housing units at an average density of 1,320.8 per square mile (509.7/km2). The racial makeup of the city was 92.85% White, 4.81% African American, 0.24% Native American, 0.08% Asian, 0.05% Pacific Islander, 0.21% from other races, and 1.76% from two or more races. Hispanic or Latino of any race were 0.72% of the population.

There were 5,261 households, out of which 32.9% had children under the age of 18 living with them, 43.5% were married couples living together, 16.6% had a female householder with no husband present, and 34.9% were non-families. 30.3% of all households were made up of individuals, and 13.5% had someone living alone who was 65 years of age or older. The average household size was 2.44 and the average family size was 3.01.

In the city the population was spread out, with 27.1% under the age of 18, 8.8% from 18 to 24, 27.3% from 25 to 44, 20.8% from 45 to 64, and 16.0% who were 65 years of age or older. The median age was 36 years. For every 100 females, there were 86.5 males. For every 100 females age 18 and over, there were 81.8 males.

The median income for a household in the city was $23,138, and the median income for a family was $27,500. Males had a median income of $27,346 versus $18,990 for females. The per capita income for the city was $12,656. About 21.5% of families and 25.2% of the population were below the poverty line, including 35.2% of those under age 18 and 13.0% of those age 65 or over.

Arts and culture

Events
Since 1970, the annual Tri-State Pottery Festival in June has celebrated the local ceramics industry with local pottery exhibits, games, amusement rides, food vendors, and live entertainment. Starting in 2021, the First Fridays on Fifth event series has taken place on the first Friday of each month from May to October, hosting local crafts, musicians, and food vendors.

Library

The Carnegie Public Library was funded by industrialist and philanthropist Andrew Carnegie, whose uncle lived in East Liverpool. Along with the Steubenville library, it was the first of the Carnegie libraries in Ohio. Designed by the local A. W. Scott, it was built with Roman mottled buff-brown brick trimmed with white tile, with construction starting in 1900. The lobby is of ceramic mosaic, the wainscoting of Italian marble and the solid brass hardware. The library opened on May 8, 1902, with Gertrude A. Baker of Mount Vernon, Ohio serving as its first librarian. The library underwent two renovations over the 1950s and early 1990s.

Historic places 
Due to being the home of a large industry with many wealthy business owners, 16 different properties and three historic districts are listed on the National Register of Historic Places, in addition to the Beginning Point of the U.S. Public Land Survey, the only National Historic Landmark in Columbiana County.

The Diamond Historic District is at the one-sided traffic diamond between Market Street and East Sixth Street. The area is triangular, bounded by three roads. Buildings at the Diamond date back to 1884. The East Fifth Street Historic District consists of three blocks of downtown East Liverpool along East Fifth street between Market Street and Broadway, listed due to its examples of Neoclassical architecture. East Liverpool Downtown Historic District covers the whole of downtown in 22 acres, and is noted for its Italianate and Second Empire architecture as well as its prominence as a commercial center in East Liverpool's history.

Many historic properties in East Liverpool were the homesteads of prominent business owners throughout the late 19th century. These include the Cassius Clark Thompson House (1876), Ikirt House (1888), Homer Laughlin House (1882), Godwin-Knowles House (1890), and the Richard L. Cawood Residence (1923), all of unique architectural styles.
	
The remaining structures on the listing are large, multi-story businesses that had historical significance in East Liverpool's economy and community during the 20th century, such as the original East Liverpool Post Office (1909), East Liverpool Pottery (1844), Andrew Carnegie's Public Library (1902), the original YMCA (1913), the Civil Works Administration's City Hall (1934), the Elks Club building (1916), Odd Fellows Temple (1907), Mary A. Patterson Memorial building (1924), Potters Savings and Loan (1904), the first Potters National Bank (1881), and the Travelers Hotel (1907).

Parks and recreation 

There are two public parks within East Liverpool city limits. Thompson Park was established after composer Will Lamartine Thompson donated 100 acres of land to the city in 1899. It opened in 1900 as a green space to get away from the industry of the city. It has been open ever since, and amenities include picnic pavilions, a swimming pool, a football field, a baseball field, a disc golf course, a playground and walking trails. The Broadway Wharf on the Ohio River includes a small public park and boat launch.

Sports 
The semipro East Liverpool Potters basketball team of the Central Basketball League played in the city from 1906 to 1909, and an  East Liverpool Potters minor league baseball club was fielded from 1906 to 1912.  The East Liverpool Country Club has a 9-hole golf course designed by Willie Park, Jr., that opened on July 14, 1921.

Government 
East Liverpool operates under a mayor–council government. Eight council members are elected as a legislature for 2-year terms, comprising four separate wards, three at-large districts, and a council president. In addition, an independently elected mayor serves as an executive. The current mayor is Gregory T. Bricker, and the current council president is John A. Torma. The mayor, auditor, treasurer, and law director are all elected to 4-year terms.

Education

Primary and secondary
Children in East Liverpool are served by the public East Liverpool City School District. The current schools serving the city are:
 La Croft Elementary School – grades K-4
 North Elementary School – grades K-4
 Westgate Middle School – grades 5-6
 East Liverpool Junior/Senior High School – grades 7-12

Private schools include the East Liverpool Christian School for grades K-12 and the Lincoln Park Performing Arts Charter School for grades 7-12. In addition, two online schools, Buckeye Online School for Success and Quaker Digital Academy, operate out of downtown. St. Aloysius School (K-8) operated for 130 years as a Roman Catholic School in the Diocese of Youngstown before closing on June 6, 2015.

Postsecondary
Kent State University has been operating a satellite campus, Kent State University at East Liverpool, since 1965. In tandem with the Kent State Salem campus, more than 20 degrees are offered, including 12 bachelor's degrees. New Castle School of Trades opened a downtown campus in 2016.

Media 
East Liverpool was once home to several newspapers in the 1800s, but most were consolidated into The Review, which today serves chiefly southern Columbiana County and northern Hancock County. Additionally, the Morning Journal out of Lisbon reports in the area.

The radio station WOHI 1490 AM has broadcast from the city since December 1, 1949, and is marketed as a classic hits station. The city also had a station on the FM dial 104.3, WOGI, but its license was moved to Moon Township, Pennsylvania, in 2000 and now serves the Pittsburgh radio market. Both stations were launched by the former East Liverpool Broadcasting Company.

Transportation

Highways 
The following highways pass through East Liverpool: 
   U.S. Route 30
   State Route 7
   State Route 11
   State Route 39
   State Route 170
   State Route 267

Bridges 
Since the 1890s, East Liverpool and the West Virginia communities of Chester and Newell have been connected by three different bridges spanning the Ohio River.
 Chester Bridge (1896–1969) – Connected College Street in East Liverpool with 1st Street in Chester. It was the original bridge to carry U.S. Route 30. The bridge closed on May 14, 1969, and was demolished in 1970.
Newell Bridge (1905–present) – Connects West 5th Street near East Liverpool City Hospital with West Virginia State Route 2. It is the only privately owned toll bridge on the Ohio River, owned and operated by the Homer Laughlin China Company out of Newell.
Jennings Randolph Bridge (1977–present) – Replaced the demolished Chester Bridge in the 1970s as the span connecting East Liverpool and Chester, and carrying Route 30 over the river. Named for West Virginia congressman/senator Jennings Randolph (in office 1933–1947 and 1958–1985, respectively).

Notable people

 Dan Adkins, comic book artist for Marvel Comics
 Bernie Allen, former Major League Baseball second baseman
 Dick Booth, former National Football League halfback
 Less Browne, former United States Football League and Canadian Football League defensive back
 John Caparulo, stand-up comedian 
 Jane Louise Curry, children's novel author
 Ben Feldman, prolific life insurance salesman
 Benedict Charles Franzetta, former Catholic bishop
 John Godwin, former Major League Baseball player
 Lou Holtz, author, television commentator, motivational speaker, and former NCAA football coach
 George P. Ikirt, physician and U.S. representative
 John Leslie, pornographic film actor, director, and producer
 Bob McFadden, voice actor
 O. O. McIntyre, columnist of New York Day by Day
 Hy Myers, former Major League Baseball player, led the National League in RBIs and slugging percentage in 1919 while playing for the Brooklyn Dodgers
 Craig Newbold, member of the Ohio House of Representatives from the 1st district
 Sally Johnston Reid, composer, educator and former president of the International Alliance for Women in Music
 Elaine Riley, actress with Paramount Pictures
 Ruth Crawford Seeger, composer and first woman to receive the Guggenheim Fellowship
 George Smith, 13th lieutenant governor of Missouri
 Josh Stansbury, mixed martial artist, former UFC light heavyweight division fighter
 Josiah Thompson, author of Six Seconds in Dallas
 Will Lamartine Thompson, composer of hymns and gospel music
 Norm Van Lier, former National Basketball Association point guard
 Jabez Vodrey, prominent early potter
 Peter Wooley, former Hollywood film producer and Emmy Award nominated art director

Sister cities
East Liverpool has one sister city:

 Stoke-on-Trent, England, United Kingdom

References

Further reading

External links
 
 East Liverpool Area Chamber of Commerce

 
Cities in Columbiana County, Ohio
Ohio populated places on the Ohio River
Populated places established in 1796
1796 establishments in the Northwest Territory
Cities in Ohio